This is an incomplete list of Statutory Instruments of the United Kingdom in 1950. This listing is the complete, 28 items, "Partial dataset" as listed on www.legislation.gov.uk (as at March 2014).

Statutory Instruments

1-999
The Trading with the Enemy (Authorisation) (Japan) Order 1950 SI 1950/28
The Trading with the Enemy (Transfer of Negotiable Instruments, etc.) (Japan) Order 1950 SI 1950/29
The Elementary School Teachers Superannuation (Amending) Rules 1950 SI 1950/60
The Pottery (Health and Welfare) Special Regulations 1950 SI 1950/65
The Coast Protection (Notices) Regulations 1950 SI 1950/124
The Commonwealth Telegraphs (Pension Rights of Cable and Wireless Ltd. Staff) Regulations 1950 SI 1950/356
The Coal Industry Nationalisation (Superannuation) Regulations 1950 SI 1950/376
The Prevention of Damage by Pests (Infestation of Food) Regulations 1950 SI 1950/416
The Registered Designs Appeal Tribunal Rules 1950 SI 1950/430 (L. 9)
The Trading with the Enemy (Custodian) Order 1950 SI 1950/494
The Lands Tribunal (War Damage Appeals Jurisdiction) Order 1950 SI 1950/513
The Grinding of Metals (Miscellaneous Industries) (Amendment) Special Regulations 1950 SI 1950/688
The Town and Country Planning General Development Order and Development Charge Applications Regulations 1950 SI 1950/728
The Double Taxation Relief (Taxes on Income) (British Solomon Islands Protectorate) Order 1950 SI 1950/748
The Double Taxation Relief (Taxes on Income) (Gilbert and Ellice Islands Colony) Order 1950 SI 1950/750
The Town and Country Planning (Churches, Places of Religious Worship and Burial Grounds) Regulations 1950 SI 1950/792

1000-2056
The National Parks and Access to the Countryside (Amendment) Regulations 1950 SI 1950/1066
The Veterinary Surgeons (University Degrees) (Liverpool) Order of Council 1950 SI 1950/1110
The Town and Country Planning (Use Classes) Order 1950 SI 1950/1131
The Foreign Compensation (Administrative and Financial Provisions) Order in Council 1950 SI 1950/1193
The Double Taxation Relief (Taxes on Income) (Denmark) Order 1950 SI 1950/1195
The Census of Distribution (1951) (Restriction on Disclosure) Order 1950 SI 1950/1245
The Veterinary Surgeons (University Degrees) (Bristol) Order of Council 1950 SI 1950/1301
The British Wool Marketing Scheme (Approval) Order 1950 SI 1950/1326
The Agricultural Marketing (Reorganisation Commission) Regulations 1950 SI 1950/1869
The Double Taxation Relief (Taxes on Income) (Brunei) Order 1950 SI 1950/1977
The Maintenance Orders Act, 1950 (Summary Jurisdiction) Rules 1950 SI 1950/2035
The Airways Corporations (General Staff Pensions) Regulations 1950 SI 1950/2056

Unreferenced Listings
The following 24 items were previously listed on this article, however are unreferenced on the authorities site, included here for a "no loss" approach.
Control of Growing Trees (Felling and Selling) Order, 1950 SI 1950/1
Control of Growing Trees (Felling and Selling) (Northern Ireland) Order, 1950 SI 1950/2
Income Tax (Applications for Increase of Wear and Tear Percentages) Regulations, 1950 SI 1950/3
Control of Paper (Specified Material) Order, 1950 SI 1950/4
Public Health (Aircraft) Regulations, 1950 SI 1950/6
Drying of Vegetables (Revocation) Order, 1950 SI 1950/7
Gas (Conversion Date) (No. 11) Order, 1950 SI 1950/10
Emergency Powers (Defence) Road Vehicles and Drivers (Revocation) Order, 1950 SI 1950/13
Boot and Shoe Repairing Wages Council (Great Britain) (Constitution) Order, 1950 SI 1950/15
Land Drainage (River Boards) General Regulations, 1950 SI 1950/16
Railways (Transport of Potatoes) Direction, 1950 SI 1950/19
Teachers Superannuation (Royal Air Force) (Locally Engaged Teachers) Scheme, 1950 SI 1950/21
Control of Paint (Revocation) Order, 1950 SI 1950/24
Utility Curtain Cloth Order, 1950 SI 1950/26
Trading with the Enemy (Custodian) (Amendment) (Japan) Order, 1950 SI 1950/30
Increase of Pensions (Calculation of Income) (Supplemental) Regulations, 1950 SI 1950/34
Lothians and Peebles Police (Amalgamation) Order, 1950 SI 1950/36
Fire Services (Ranks and Conditions of Service) Regulations, 1950 SI 1950/38
Hire-Purchase and Credit Sale Agreements (Maximum Prices and Charges) Order, 1950 SI 1950/39
Calf Rearing Scheme (England, Wales and Northern Ireland) (Extension and Payment) Order, 1950 SI 1950/41
Superannuation (Appointment of End of War Period) Order, 1950 SI 1950/42
Grinding of Cutlery and Edge Tools (Amendment) Special Regulations 1950 SI 1950/370
Utility Woven Cloth (Cotton, Rayon and Linen) (Amendment) Order, 1950 SI 1950/450
Foundries (Parting Materials) Special Regulations 1950 SI 1950/1700

See also
 List of Statutory Instruments of the United Kingdom

References

External links
Legislation.gov.uk delivered by the UK National Archive
UK SI's on legislation.gov.uk
UK Draft SI's on legislation.gov.uk

Lists of Statutory Instruments of the United Kingdom
Statutory Instruments